Nikita Valeryevich Vasilyev (born 22 March 1992) is a Russian professional football player.

Club career
He made his Russian Premier League debut for FC Rostov on 22 June 2011 in a game against FC Tom Tomsk.

References

External links
 

1992 births
Sportspeople from Pskov
Living people
Russian footballers
Russia youth international footballers
Russia under-21 international footballers
Association football midfielders
Russian Premier League players
FC Rostov players
FC Chernomorets Novorossiysk players
FC Torpedo Moscow players
FC SKA Rostov-on-Don players
FC Nizhny Novgorod (2015) players
FC Zenit-Izhevsk players
FC Hvardiyets Hvardiiske players